The Nima II River is a river of Guatemala.

See also
List of rivers of Guatemala

References

Rivers of Guatemala